"Blacken My Thumb" is a single by New Zealand rock band The Datsuns in 2004. It charted in the UK, peaking at number 48.

Track listing
CD
"Blacken My Thumb"
"Good Luck ... You're Gonna Need It"
"Burst Your Bubble"

Vinyl
"Blacken My Thumb"
"Not Coming Back"

2004 singles
2004 songs
The Datsuns songs